TXTR or Txtr may refer to:

 Motorola TXTR, portable-phone keyboard 
 txtR, a transcriptional regulator protein in Streptomyces scabies
 TXTR, the NYSE stock symbol for Textura Corporation